Ellen Perez and Carol Zhao were the defending champions, but Zhao chose not to participate.

Perez partnered alongside Arina Rodionova and successfully defended her title, beating Erika Sema and Aiko Yoshitomi in the final, 7–5, 6–4.

Seeds

Draw

Draw

References
Main Draw

Challenger Banque Nationale de Granby - Doubles
Challenger de Granby